The 2002–03 AS Saint-Étienne season was the club's 70th season in existence and the second consecutive season in the second division of French football. In addition to the domestic league, Amiens participated in this season's edition of the Coupe de France and the Coupe de la Ligue. The season covered the period from 1 July 2002 to 30 June 2003.

Players

First-team squad

Transfers

In

Out

Pre-season and friendlies

Competitions

Overview

Ligue 2

League table

Results summary

Results by round

Matches

Coupe de France

Coupe de la Ligue

References

External links

AS Saint-Étienne seasons
Saint-Étienne